The 1941 United States Senate special election in Texas was held on June 28, 1941 to complete the unexpired term of Senator Morris Sheppard, who died in office on April 9. Interim Senator Andrew Jackson Houston did not run for re-election and died only two days before the election. The race was won by Governor Pappy O'Daniel with a plurality of the vote; no majority was required.

O'Daniel very narrowly defeated U.S. Representative Lyndon B. Johnson, who won the seat after O'Daniel's retirement in 1948.

Background
In April 1941, incumbent Senator Morris Sheppard died in office. Governor Pappy O'Daniel appointed Andrew Jackson Houston to fill the seat until a successor could be duly elected, with the election scheduled for June 28. The winner finished Sheppard's term ending in 1943.

Houston did not run to complete the term, only serving as a placeholder for Governor O'Daniel. He died in office only two days before the election.

Candidates

Major candidates
Martin Dies Jr., U.S. Representative from Lufkin and Chair of the House Un-American Activities Committee
Lyndon B. Johnson, U.S. Representative from Gillespie County
Gerald Mann, Attorney General of Texas
Pappy O'Daniel, Governor of Texas

Minor candidates
None of these candidates received more than 0.30% of the popular vote.

All of these candidates were Democrats except Evans (Republican), Fletcher (Republican), Jones (Independent), and Brooks (Communist).

Results

See also 
 1941 United States Senate elections

References

1941
Texas
United States Senate
Texas 1941
Texas 1941
United States Senate 1941